Transmission may refer to:

Medicine, science and technology
 Power transmission
 Electric power transmission
 Transmission (mechanical device), technology that allows controlled application of power
 Automatic transmission
 Manual transmission
 Signal transmission, the process of sending and propagating an analogue or digital information signal
 Analogue transmission - the process of sending and propagating an analogue signal
 Data transmission, the process of sending and propagating digital information
 Signaling (telecommunications) - transmission of meta-information related to the actual transmission
 Monetary transmission mechanism, process by which asset prices and general economic conditions are affected as a result of monetary policy decisions
 Pathogen transmission, the passing of a disease from an infected host individual or group to a particular individual or group
 Cellular signaling - transmission of signals within or between living cells 
 Transmission in genetics, known otherwise as heredity, the transfer of genetic information from genes to another generation
 Transmission (BitTorrent client), a free, open-source and cross-platform BitTorrent client application

Arts and entertainment

Music
 Transmission (band), an English experimental/post-rock band
 Transmission (festival), an annual trance music event
 Transmission Communications, an Australian record label

Albums
 Transmission (Gay Dad album) or the title song, 2001
 Transmission (The Tea Party album) or the title song, 1997
 Transmission (Violent Delight album) or the title song, 2003
 Transmissions (Alan Silva and Oluyemi Thomas album), 1993
 Transmissions (Juno Reactor album), 1993
 Transmissions (Starset album), 2014
 Transmission (Low EP), 1996
 Transmission (Mêlée EP), 2001

Songs
 "Transmission" (song), by Joy Division, 1979
 "Transmission", a mashup by Neil Cicierega from Mouth Silence, 2014
 "Transmissions", a song by the American band Bright from The Albatross Guest House, 1997
 "Transmissions', a song by the Irish band God Is an Astronaut from Origins, 2013

Other media
 Transmission (magazine), a UK literary magazine
 Transmission (novel), a 2005 novel by Hari Kunzru
 Transmission (TV programme), a British music programme
 Transmission, a webcomic by Mark A. Smith, former cartoonist for The Space Gypsy Adventures

Other uses
Transmission (esotericism)

See also
 Transmit (file transfer tool), a FTP client for Mac OS X
 Transmitter, a device for propagating electronic signals
 Transmissibility (disambiguation)
 Transmittance of radiation, the propagation of electromagnetic waves through a medium
 Transmissivity (disambiguation)